Anna Gordon (24 August 1747 – 11 July 1810), also known as Mrs Brown or Mrs Brown of Falkland, was one of the most important British ballad collectors.

Life

Rather little is known of Anna's life. She was born in Old Aberdeen, youngest daughter to Lilias Forbes of Disblair and her husband Thomas Gordon (1714–1797), who was the professor of humanity at King's College, Aberdeen. Details of Anna's education are unclear. On 13 December 1788 she married the Revd Dr Andrew Brown (c. 1744–1805), who, following work as a chaplain in the army, became minister of Falkland, Fife (1784–1802), and then Tranent. Thus Anna is widely known among scholars as Mrs Brown of Falkland.

However, Anna is famed as a collector of Scottish ballads. Fifty of Anna's ballads were written down between about 1783 and 1801; some were published by Walter Scott and Robert Jamieson in Minstrelsy of the Scottish Border (1802) and Popular Ballads and Songs (1806). 27 of the ‘A’ texts in English and Scottish Popular Ballads (1882–98) by Francis James Child were supplied by Anna. She is an important source, for example, of a text of Thomas the Rhymer.

The sources of Anna's repertory are therefore viewed as an important question; she seems to have learned it as a child from her mother, her mother's sister Anne Forbes (Mrs Farquharson of Allanaquoich), and from an unnamed nursemaid. Music was prominent in her family background. However, access to music was in Scotland at the time highly gendered: membership of, for example, the Aberdeen Musical Society (to which Anna's father belonged) was closed to women. 'Anna Gordon's father expressed surprise at his daughter's skill in balladry and confessed that the words and tunes were previously unknown to him (as they were to his correspondent, the antiquary William Tytler, 1711–1792).'

Whatever the precise relationship of Anna's ballads to earlier oral tradition, Anna's correspondence reveals 'a woman with a well-defined aesthetic sense, an established knowledge of literature and ballad scholarship, and some sense of the importance of her contributions to that scholarship'.

Literary significance

The literary significance of Anna Gordon's ballads is undisputed—but its precise character has been a matter of considerable debate:

The ballad repertoire of Anna Gordon (alternately known as Mrs. Brown of Falkland) has generated both admiration and controversy since the end of the eighteenth century, when the texts were first recorded. Dismissed by Ritson as new-fangled and by Scott as inauthentic, Mrs. Brown’s ballads were considered exemplary by both Robert Jamieson and, later, Francis James Child, who gave her variants pride of place in The English and Scottish Popular Ballads as instances of the best the popular ballad tradition had to offer. In the twentieth century, the differences between her renditions of several specific ballads became the focus of scholarly attention—held up by Bertrand Bronson as examples of oral re-creation and subsequently used by other scholars as ammunition in the conflict over the applicability of oral-formulaic theory to European balladry.

Whatever the case, Anna's ballads seem to represent an important insight into eighteenth-century women's literature:

 Anna Gordon's ballads are framed from an explicitly female, indeed even feminist, perspective, and carry behind their courtly and magical façade a frequently brutal reality. The ambience is of love and death, the cruelties of fate and chance, and of perilous, enchanted wooings. The songs chart their youthful heroines' transition from secure maternal households to the dangerous world of men and their violently possessive female kin, at whose hands the protagonists risk not merely rejection but sometimes mutilation or even death. The ballads speak of murderous sexual rivalry between female siblings and hint at infanticide as a form of revenge upon treacherous males. Adventures in the magical greenwood, a metaphor for transgressive sexuality, have a strong appeal but usually alarming consequences. Indeed, the dangers of sex are stressed on every side, along with the sheer physical hazard of being female.

Editions

The definitive edition of Anna Gordon's work is The Ballad Repertoire of Anna Gordon, Mrs Brown of Falkland, ed. by Sigrid Rieuwerts, The Scottish Text Society, Fifth Series, 8 (Woodbridge: Boydell and Brewer, 2011) .

Sources 

William Donaldson, ‘Gordon, Anna (1747–1810)’, Oxford Dictionary of National Biography (Oxford University Press, 2004): doi:10.1093/ref:odnb/55496.

1747 births
1810 deaths
Scottish folk-song collectors